Francis Eustace Baker  (born 19 April 1933) is a British businessman who was the Governor of Saint Helena, Ascension and Tristan da Cunha between 1984 and 1988. While he was Governor, he implemented a '3 day working scheme' to help tackle unemployment and announced the plans to build the 2nd RMS St Helena, which was, up until the construction of St Helena's airport, the main link between the territory and the rest of the world. He received the Order of the British Empire (OBE) in 1979 and the CBE in 1984.

References

Living people
Governors of Saint Helena
British colonial governors and administrators in Africa
Tristan da Cunha
Ascension Island
1933 births
Commanders of the Order of the British Empire